Carposina asbolopis is a moth in the family Carposinidae. It was described by Edward Meyrick in 1928. It is found in New Caledonia.

References

Carposinidae
Moths described in 1928